Kapeeka is a town in Nakaseke District of the Central Region of Uganda. 

Kapeeka will merge with Semuto to form the  Semuto municipality as requested by residents and given a go ahead by the president.

Location
The coordinates of the town are 0°40'54.0"N, 32°14'48.0"E (Latitude:0.681667; Longitude:32.246667).

Overview
Kapeeka is the northernmost location on the  Matugga–Kapeeka Road, linking Matugga and Gombe in Wakiso District to Semuto and Kapeeka in Nakaseke District. It was upgraded from gravel to bitumen between 2008 and 2011. Chongqing International Construction Corporation (CICO) of China performed the work at a cost of about US$20 million (USh:37.9 billion). Sixty-five percent of the funding was provided by the government of Uganda, and the Nordic Development Fund lent the remaining 35 percent. COWI A/S, a Danish consultancy firm, supervised the work.

Points of interest
The following additional points of interest are found within the town limits or close to its borders: (a) Kapeeka central market (b) offices of Kapeeka Town Council (c) offices of Kapeeka sub-county and (e) Namunkekera Rural Industrial Center (NRIC), is located at Namunkekera, Nakaseke District, west of Kapeeka.

See also
List of cities and towns in Uganda
List of roads in Uganda

References

External links
More Than 100 Road Signs Stolen On New Matugga-Semuto Road

Nakaseke District
Populated places in Central Region, Uganda